Vigor Industrial (Vigor) is an American shipbuilding, shiprepair, and industrial service provider in the Pacific Northwest and Alaska. Based in Portland, Oregon, the company consists of several subsidiary companies for a combined total of seven facilities with ten drydocks, more than 17,000 feet of pier space, and over 2,000 employees.

History
In the Northwest the company history goes back nearly 100 years, with Todd Pacific in Washington and Kaiser Shipyard in Oregon. In 1916 the Harbor Island facility in Seattle began operations as Todd Pacific Shipyards. In 1942 the Swan Island facility in Portland began operations as Kaiser Shipyards. In 1995, Vigor Industrial owner, Frank Foti bought Cascade General on the verge of bankruptcy from its previous owners, operating on leased space from the Port of Portland shipyard. With funding from the then-publicly traded Cammell Laird PLC in the UK, Transamerica Capital and Heller Capital, the Swan Island facility was purchased from the port in 2000 and the name Vigor Industrial was established. In 2002, Vigor Industrial expanded operations to Port Angeles, WA with its subsidiary Washington Marine Repair. In 2010, purchased Marine Industries Northwest (MINI) in Tacoma, WA. In 2011 they purchased Todd Pacific's operations in Seattle, Bremerton, and Everett. In 2012 they acquired Alaska Ship & Drydock in Ketchikan, Alaska.

In May 2014, the company announced that it was merging with Oregon Iron Works, another manufacturer based in the Portland area.  Although both companies referred to it as a "merger", the deal made Oregon Iron Works a division of Vigor, a wholly owned subsidiary.

In March 2015, Vigor Industrial acquired Seattle-based aluminum workboat manufacturer Kvichak Marine Industries.

Vigor announced in late 2017 that it had won a $1 billion contract to produce U.S. Army landing craft, the largest contract in its history. The company selected Vancouver, Washington as the production site for the vessels.

In July 2019, The Carlyle Group and Stellex Capital Management agreed to acquire and merge Vigor Industrial with MHI Holdings LLC.

Vigor Industrial companies
Vigor Industrial has several subsidiary companies which each focus on different specialties:
 Vigor Fab is Vigor's Pacific Northwest new-build subsidiary serving the needs of maritime customers from its facilities in Portland, OR, and Seattle and Everett, WA.
 Vigor Alaska or provides new-build, heavy fabrication, ship repair, and maintenance services in Ketchikan, Alaska.
 Vigor Marine specializes in commercial ship repair in Portland, OR, and Seattle, Tacoma and Everett, WA with the ability to mobilize teams to anywhere they are needed, including Hawaii.
 Washington Marine Repair provides resources for topside repair in Port Angeles, Washington.
 Vigor Shipyards handles maintenance for the  Navy and  Coast Guard in Seattle, Everett, and Bremerton, WA.
 Vigor Machine offers turbine and machining services from its facility in Portland, OR as well as on-site at customers' locations.
 Specialty Finishes and its Specialty Marine Decking unit provide industrial coating and marine decking services.
 Oregon Iron Works (acquired in 2014)
 Vigor Ballard is a Seattle, WA-based shipyard which provides new-build small vessel for government agencies or forces, its predecessor is Kvichak Marine.

Facilities

Vigor Industrial has five Washington locations in Seattle, Tacoma, Everett, Bremerton and Port Angeles. They also have locations in Portland, Oregon and Ketchikan, Alaska. The seven facilities have a combined total of 10 drydocks and more than 17,000 feet in pier space and detailed in the table below.

Recent builds

References

External links
 
 https://web.archive.org/web/20120510075104/http://shipbuildinghistory.com/history/shipyards/5small/active/usbarge.htm
 https://web.archive.org/web/20120510101804/http://shipbuildinghistory.com/history/shipyards/2large/active/toddseattle.htm

2000 establishments in Oregon
Companies based in Portland, Oregon
American companies established in 2000 
Shipbuilding companies of Oregon
Water transportation in Alaska
Manufacturing companies established in 2000